The California Institute of Technology has had numerous notable alumni and faculty.

Notable alumni

Alumni who went on to become members of the faculty are listed only in this category.

Physics and astronomy

Chemistry and chemical engineering

Biology, biological engineering, and medicine

Mathematics and computer science

Engineering and applied science

Geological, environmental, and planetary sciences

Business

Economics, finance, and social science

Government and politics

Other fields

Notable faculty

Members of the faculty are listed under the name of the academic division to which they belong.

Physics, mathematics, and astronomy

Chemistry and chemical engineering

Biology and biological engineering

Engineering and applied science

Geological and planetary sciences

Humanities and social sciences

See also 
 List of Nobel laureates affiliated with California Institute of Technology

References

Lists of people by university or college in California